The Wild Wild Wild West Stunt Show was a live-action theatrical presentation featuring dangerous-appearing stunts in a scripted presentation along with various mechanical  and pyrotechnic special effects. The show was first mounted at Universal Studios Hollywood, opening in 1980.

History 

The Wild Wild Wild West Stunt Show was a live stunt show at Universal Studios Hollywood, based upon a hodgepodge of Universal's Western films. Opening in 1980 in the upper lot section of the park, the show featured cowboy-themed actors surviving death-defying stunts, shootings and explosions.  The show closed in 2002, leaving the arena abandoned except for its use during Halloween Horror Nights and Grinchmas. It was finally demolished in 2012.

The Wild Wild Wild West Stunt Show was also opened at Universal Studios Florida on July 4, 1991, in the World Expo section of the park.  The show was nearly an exact recreation of the show from USH, although the amphitheater was more modern and better appointed. The show closed on September 1, 2003, and was replaced by Fear Factor Live which opened on June 3, 2005.

A similar show is still shown at former Universal-owned theme park PortAventura Park.

The Wild Wild Wild West Stunt Show opened on  March 31, 2001, in the Western Town section of Universal Studios Japan. The show closed in 2006 and has since been replaced by Wicked.  The Western Area, and with it The Wild Wild Wild West Stunt Show and the Animal Actors show, were revamped to become Land of Oz in 2006. This involved completely re-theming two live shows, one restaurant, and a number of retail facilities.

A re-themed version of this show was opened at Wakayama Marina City's Porto Europa Theme Park under the title Viking Adventure. Although featuring Vikings rather than cowboys, the script was virtually the same, and the major stunts were re-created verbatim. This included the high fall onto a wooden breakaway platform, and the climactic "falling facade" gag. The show is now closed.

References 

Amusement rides introduced in 1980
Amusement rides introduced in 1991
Amusement rides introduced in 2001
Amusement rides that closed in 2002
Amusement rides that closed in 2003
Amusement rides that closed in 2006
Former Universal Studios Hollywood attractions
Former Universal Studios Florida attractions
Universal Studios Japan
Universal Parks & Resorts attractions by name
1980 establishments in California
1991 establishments in Florida
2001 establishments in Japan
2002 disestablishments in California
2003 disestablishments in Florida
2006 disestablishments in Japan